The Drăgan is a left tributary of the river Crișul Repede in Romania. It discharges into the Crișul Repede near Valea Drăganului.

Tributaries

The following rivers are tributaries to the Drăgan:

Left: Ciripa, Chențu, Sebeș, Valea Lunga
Right: Moara Dracului, Buteasa, Crăciun, Zârna, Dara, Valea Bulzurilor

References

Rivers of Romania
Rivers of Bihor County
Rivers of Cluj County